Kathleen Stark (born 9 September 1975) is a German former gymnast. She competed at the 1992 Summer Olympics and the 1996 Summer Olympics.

Competitive history

References

External links
 

1975 births
Living people
German female artistic gymnasts
Olympic gymnasts of Germany
Gymnasts at the 1992 Summer Olympics
Gymnasts at the 1996 Summer Olympics
Sportspeople from Rostock
20th-century German women
21st-century German women